Hirvand (also Romanized as Hīrvand; also known as Birkeh Hirvand, Qal‘eh Berkeh-e-Harvand, and Qal‘eh-ye Berkeh Harvand) is a village in Moghuyeh Rural District, in the Central District of Bandar Lengeh County, Hormozgan Province, Iran. At the 2006 census, its population was 141, in 30 families.

References 

Populated places in Bandar Lengeh County